First Statement Stadium is a multi-purpose stadium in Benghazi, Libya. Built in 2008, it is currently used mostly for football matches and is the home ground of numerous clubs in the city. The stadium holds 1,500, measuring 68m by 105m.

References 

Football venues in Libya
Multi-purpose stadiums in Libya